Jourdain is a surname.

People
People with the surname Jourdain:
 Alice von Hildebrand (née Jourdain), Belgian-American philosopher, theologian and college professor
 Amable Jourdain (1788–1818), French historian and orientalist
 Anselme Jourdain (1731–1816), French dentist and surgeon
 Bernard Jourdain (born 1950), Mexican race car driver
 Eleanor Jourdain (1863–1924), English academic and author
 Étienne Jourdain (1900–?), French wrestler
 Francis Charles Robert Jourdain (1865–1940), British ornithologist and oologist
 Francis Jourdain (1876–1958), French decorative artist and political activist
 Frantz Jourdain (1847–1935), Belgian architect and author
 John Jourdain (?–1619), English navigator and businessman
 Jonathan Genest-Jourdain (born 1979), Canadian politician
 Luc Brodeur-Jourdain (born 1983), Canadian football player
 Margaret Jourdain (1876–1951), English furniture writer
 Marie-Claude Jourdain, better known as Lova Moor (born 1946), French dancer and singer
 Michel Jourdain
Michel Jourdain Sr. (born 1947), Mexican race car driver
Michel Jourdain Jr. (born 1976), Mexican race car driver
 Patrick Jourdain (1942–2016), British bridge player, teacher and journalist
 Paul Jourdain (1878–1948), French industrialist and politician
 Philip Jourdain (1879–1919), English logician
 Roger Jourdain (1912–2002), Ojibwe civic leader
 Yonel Jourdain (born 1971), American footballer

Fictional characters
 Jourdain de Blaye, title character of a chanson de geste
 Monsieur Jourdain, main character in Molière's Le Bourgeois gentilhomme

See also
 Jourdain Society, formerly the 'British Oological Association', an organisation for egg-collectors
 Jordan (disambiguation)
 Jordanus (disambiguation)
 Jourdan (disambiguation)

English-language surnames
French-language surnames
Lists of people by surname